Bayou Dupre is a bayou in southeastern Louisiana.

References 

Bodies of water of St. Bernard Parish, Louisiana
Wetlands and bayous of Louisiana